Christopher Daniel Peppler (born October 22, 1957, in Tokyo, Japan), simply known as , is a Japanese-American radio personality.

Peppler is a navigator for J-Wave's Tokio Hot 100 and the host of Tokyo Eye 2020.

Personal life
Peppler was born to a German-American father and a Japanese mother in Seibo Hospital. There isn't any Japanese in his name due to the request of his mother, who wanted to name her son Chris. Through his grandmother, he is a descendant of Akechi Mitsuhide.

After graduating from St. Mary International School, he moved to California. He later moved back to Japan to begin his DJ career. Shortly after in 2006, he met and married fellow DJ Yukari Kimishima.

He is also fluent in French as his third language.

Filmography

Radio and TV series

J-Wave

NHK

Nippon TV

Tokyo Broadcasting System

TV Asahi

Tokyo MX

BS Asahi

Fox Network

Advertisements

Video Games

Anime

Films

Musicals

Others

References

External links
  

Japanese radio personalities
1957 births
Living people
People from Tokyo
Japanese people of German descent